was a  after Eishō and before Kōhei,  spanning the years from January 1053 through August 1058.

Change of Era
 1053 : The new era name was created to mark an event or series of events. The previous era ended and the new one commenced in Eishō 7, on the 11th day of the 1st month of 1053.

Events of the Tengi Era
 1056 (Tengi 4, 7th-8th months): A broom star was observed in the east at daybreak.
 1057 (Tengi 5, 9th month): Abe no Yoritoki is killed in battle by a stray arrow.

Notes

References
 Ackroyd, Joyce. (1982) Lessons from History: The Tokushi Yoron. Brisbane: University of Queensland Press. ; OCLC 7574544 
 Brown, Delmer M. and Ichirō Ishida, eds. (1979).  Gukanshō: The Future and the Past. Berkeley: University of California Press. ;  OCLC 251325323
 Nussbaum, Louis-Frédéric and Käthe Roth. (2005).  Japan encyclopedia. Cambridge: Harvard University Press. ;  OCLC 58053128
 Pankenier, David W., Zhentao Xu and Yaotiao Jiang. (2008). Archaeoastronomy in East Asia: Historical Observational Records of Comets and Meteor Showers from China, Japan, and Korea. Amherst, New York: Cambria Press.  ;  OCLC 269455845
 Titsingh, Isaac. (1834). Nihon Odai Ichiran; ou,  Annales des empereurs du Japon.  Paris: Royal Asiatic Society, Oriental Translation Fund of Great Britain and Ireland. OCLC 5850691
 Varley, H. Paul. (1980). A Chronicle of Gods and Sovereigns: Jinnō Shōtōki of Kitabatake Chikafusa. New York: Columbia University Press. ;  OCLC 6042764

External links
 National Diet Library, "The Japanese Calendar" -- historical overview plus illustrative images from library's collection

Japanese eras